Henry Walter Maier (February 7, 1918 – July 17, 1994) was an American politician and the longest-serving mayor of Milwaukee, Wisconsin, holding office from 1960 to 1988.  A Democrat, Maier was a powerful and controversial figure, presiding over an era of economic and political turbulence for the city of Milwaukee.

Early life 

Maier was born Henry Walter David Nelke in Dayton, Ohio. After his father died, he moved with his mother to Springfield, Ohio to live with his grandparents. He graduated from Springfield High School in 1936. When his mother moved to Milwaukee and married contractor Charles Maier, Nelke accompanied her. He changed his name to Henry Walter Maier in 1938.

Maier served in the United States Navy during World War II. He earned a bachelor's degree from the University of Wisconsin–Madison and a master's degree from University of Wisconsin–Milwaukee. Maier was in the insurance business and taught workers' compensation and general liability insurance at the University of Wisconsin–Milwaukee.

Political career 
A member of the Democratic Party, Maier was elected to the Wisconsin State Senate in 1950. In 1960 he was elected Milwaukee's mayor, succeeding Frank Zeidler, the last of Milwaukee's Socialist mayors. Maier's term included the 1967 Milwaukee riot, a response by the African-American community to a host of issues including housing discrimination and police brutality. (Maier's opposition to the Civil Rights Movement caused constant friction with his administration and Milwaukee's non-white residents). Maier remained in office for 28 years, succeeded by John Norquist in 1988. He was the longest-serving mayor in Milwaukee history.

In 1971 and 1972, he served as president of the United States Conference of Mayors. A 1993 survey of historians, political scientists and urban experts conducted by Melvin G. Holli of the University of Illinois at Chicago ranked Maier as the fourteenth-best American big-city mayor to have served between the years 1820 and 1993.

Later life, death, and legacy
In 1993, Maier wrote a political memoir: The Mayor Who Made Milwaukee Famous. He died of pneumonia at age 76 at his home in Delafield, Wisconsin. The Henry Maier Festival Park, where Summerfest is held, was named in his honor.

See also

List of mayors of Milwaukee

Notes

External links

 Henry W. Maier at University of Wisconsin-Milwaukee Libraries
 'Urban Statesman' Steps Down in The Washington Post
 Henry Maier at Milwaukee Magazine
 Henry W. Maier (1919-2005) at CYC-Online

|-

1918 births
1994 deaths
20th-century American businesspeople
20th-century American politicians
Businesspeople from Milwaukee
Deaths from pneumonia in Wisconsin
Democratic Party Wisconsin state senators
Mayors of Milwaukee
Military personnel from Dayton, Ohio
Military personnel from Milwaukee
Politicians from Dayton, Ohio
Politicians from Springfield, Ohio
Presidents of the United States Conference of Mayors
United States Navy personnel of World War II
University of Wisconsin–Madison alumni
University of Wisconsin–Milwaukee alumni
University of Wisconsin–Milwaukee faculty
Writers from Dayton, Ohio
Writers from Milwaukee